Benton is an English surname, which means "town in the bent grass" or "is from the place where the bear grass grows". The name may refer to:

Al Benton (1911–1968), American baseball player
Andrew K. Benton (born c. 1952), American lawyer and academic administrator
Arthur L. Benton (1909–2006), American neuropsychologist
Barbi Benton (born 1950), American model and actress
Bernard Benton (born 1957), American boxer
Billy Benton (1895–1967), English footballer
Brook Benton (1931–1988), American musician
Buster Benton (1932–1996), American blues guitarist and singer 
Charles S. Benton (1810–1882), American politician
Dave Benton (born 1951), Aruban-Estonian singer
Don Benton (born 1957), American politician
Eddie Benton (born 1975), American basketball player and coach
Elijah Benton (born 1996), American football player
Glen Benton (born 1967), American bass guitarist
Grady Benton (born 1973), American football player
Jack Benton (1875–1926), English footballer
Jacob Benton (1814–1892), American politician
Jeffrey Benton (born 1953), Australian cricketer
Jerome Benton (born 1962), American musician
Jesse Benton (born 1977), American political operative
Jessica Benton (born 1942), British actress
Jim Benton (born 1960), American illustrator
Jim Benton (American football) (1916–2001), American football player
Joe Benton (born 1933), British politician
John Keith Benton (1896–1956), American university administrator
Joshua Benton (born 1975), American journalist
Keeanu Benton (born 2001), American football player
Kenneth Benton, (1909–1999), British intelligence officer
Lemuel Benton (1754–1818), American politician
Louisa Dow Benton (1831–1895), American linguist
Maecenas Benton (1848–1924), American politician
Mark Benton (born 1965), British actor
Michael Benton (born 1956), British paleontologist
Morris Fuller Benton (1872–1948), American typeface designer
Nathaniel S. Benton (1792–1869), American politician
Nicholas F. Benton (born 1944), American journalist
Nick Benton (cricketer) (born 1991), Australian cricketer
Rabbit Benton (1901–1984), American baseball player
Robert Benton (born 1932), American director
Samuel Benton (1820–1864), American attorney
Scott Benton (born 1974), English rugby union player
Scott Benton (politician), British politician
Thomas Benton (disambiguation), multiple people
Tommy Benton (born 1950), American politician
Walter Benton (1930–2000), American musician
Walter Benton (poet) (1907–1976), American poet
William Benton (disambiguation), multiple people

Fiction
Peter Benton, fictional character from ER
Sergeant Benton, fictional character from Doctor Who

See also
Benton (disambiguation)
Brains Benton, children's book series

References

English-language surnames